Joseph-Hermas Leclerc (12 July 1877 – 4 October 1945) was a Liberal party member of the House of Commons of Canada. He was born in Saint-Germain-de-Grantham, Quebec in Drummond County and became an industrialist by career.

Leclerc served as an alderman of Granby, Quebec for 6 years, then was the community's mayor from 1933 to 1939.

He was first elected to Parliament at the Shefford riding in the 1935 general election and re-elected there in 1940. After his second term in the House of Commons, Leclerc did not seek further re-election in the 1945 federal election.

References

External links
 

1877 births
1945 deaths
Liberal Party of Canada MPs
Mayors of places in Quebec
Members of the House of Commons of Canada from Quebec
Quebec municipal councillors